The Game is a 1997 American thriller film directed by David Fincher, starring Michael Douglas, Sean Penn, Deborah Kara Unger and James Rebhorn and produced by Propaganda Films and PolyGram Filmed Entertainment. It tells the story of a wealthy investment banker who is given a mysterious birthday gift by his brother—participation in a game that integrates in strange ways with his everyday life. As the lines between the banker's real life and the game become more uncertain, hints of a larger conspiracy begin to unfold.

The Game was well-received by critics like Roger Ebert and major periodicals like The New York Times, but had middling box-office returns compared to the success of Fincher's previous film Se7en (1995). The film later gained a strong cult following among Fincher's fans with some noting it as one of his most underrated films.

Plot
Nicholas Van Orton, a wealthy, selfish investment banker in San Francisco, has lunch with his estranged younger brother Conrad, who gifts him an unusual present for his 48th birthday— a voucher for a game offered by a company called Consumer Recreation Services (CRS). Though skeptical, he goes to the CRS office to apply, but the time-consuming psychological and physical examinations required irritate him, and he is later informed that his application has been rejected.

Nicholas returns home one evening to find a wooden clown outside, and later discovers a hidden camera inside. He is also contacted by a CRS employee through his distorted television screen who tells him not to try and figure out the object of the game. More bizarre events continue happening; Nicholas initially thinks CRS are simply staging elaborate pranks, but then he starts to believe his business, reputation and safety are endangered. Nicholas is also haunted by his father's suicide, which he witnessed as a child. He meets a waitress, Christine, who becomes involved. Nicholas contacts the police, but they find the CRS office abandoned.

Conrad visits Nicholas and apologizes, claiming CRS has attacked him. An argument breaks out between the two brothers, resulting in Conrad running away - leaving Nicholas on his own. Nicholas gets into a taxi, however, after locking the doors the driver jumps out before the car crashes into the sea. Nicholas manages to escape the sinking car and make it to the surface. With no one else to turn to, Nicholas finds Christine's home, and discovers she is a CRS employee. When she tells him they are being watched, Nicholas attacks a nearby camera, and armed CRS personnel swarm the house. When they fire at the two of them, Nicholas and Christine flee. Christine later tells him CRS has drained his bank accounts by guessing his passwords using the psychological tests he completed; his bank confirms such. He then begins to feel dizzy and realizes Christine has drugged him. As he loses consciousness, she admits she is part of the scam and says he made a fatal mistake in giving his card security code over the phone.

Nicholas wakes entombed alive in a Mexico cemetery. He sells his watch to return to San Francisco, where he finds his mansion foreclosed and most of his possessions removed. He contacts the hotel where Conrad was staying, and is told his brother has been committed to a mental institution following a nervous breakdown. Nicholas retrieves a hidden gun and seeks his ex-wife for help. While apologizing to her for his neglect, he learns that Jim Feingold, the CRS employee who conducted his tests, is an actor working in television advertisements. He finds Jim and forces him to find the real CRS office and takes Christine hostage, demanding to be taken to the head of CRS.

Attacked by CRS guards, Nicholas takes Christine to the roof. Christine, realizing Nicholas's gun is not a prop, frantically tells him it is only a game; his finances are intact, and his family and friends are waiting on the other side of the door. He refuses to believe her, and Nicholas shoots the first person to emerge— Conrad, bearing a bottle of champagne. Devastated, Nicholas then leaps off the roof but lands on a giant air cushion. He is greeted by Conrad (who is alive since the gun was indeed actually a prop, and Christine's fear of the gun faked) and the rest of the people from the game; absolutely everything had been staged by Conrad for his birthday present, with the intention of helping Nicholas become a better person and embrace life.

After a birthday party with friends, Christine (whose real name is revealed to be Claire) declines Nicholas' offer for a date as she has another job lined up in Australia. She instead agrees to have coffee with him at the airport.

Cast

Production

Development
The Game was originally a spec screenplay written by John Brancato and Michael Ferris in 1991. It was sold to Metro-Goldwyn-Mayer that year, but the project was put in turnaround and eventually picked up by Propaganda Films. Director Jonathan Mostow was attached to the project, while Kyle MacLachlan and Bridget Fonda cast in the lead roles. Principal photography was scheduled to start in February 1993, but in early 1992, the project was moved to PolyGram Filmed Entertainment, and Mostow was became an executive producer.

Producer Steve Golin bought the script from MGM and gave it to David Fincher, hoping he would direct. Fincher liked the plot twists but brought in Andrew Kevin Walker, who had worked with him on Seven, to make the character of Nicholas more cynical. Fincher and Walker spent six weeks changing the tone and trying to make the story work. According to Fincher, there were three primary influences on The Game: Michael Douglas' character was a "fashionable, good-looking Scrooge, lured into a Mission: Impossible situation with a steroid shot in the thigh from The Sting". In an interview, Fincher explained that his film differed from others of that kind because "movies usually make a pact with the audience that says: we're going to play it straight. What we show you is going to add up. But we don't do that. In that respect, it's about movies and how movies dole out information." Fincher also stated that the film is about "loss of control. The purpose of The Game is to take your greatest fear, put it this close to your face and say 'There, you're still alive. It's all right.'"

More revisions were made to the script, including removing a scene where Nicholas kills Christine and then commits suicide, as Fincher felt that it did not make sense. In 1996, Larry Gross and Walker were brought in to make revisions to the script.

Casting
Fincher had intended to make The Game before Seven, but when Brad Pitt became available for Seven, that project became the top priority. The success of Seven helped the producers of The Game get the larger budget that they wanted. They then approached Michael Douglas to star in the film. He was hesitant at first because he was concerned that PolyGram was not a big enough company to distribute the film. However, once he was on board, Douglas' presence helped to get the film into production.

At the 1996 Cannes Film Festival, PolyGram announced that Jodie Foster would star in the film with Douglas. However, Fincher was uncomfortable with putting an actor and movie star of her stature in a supporting part. After talking to her, he considered rewriting the character of Conrad as Nicholas' daughter so that Foster could play that role. However, Douglas did not like the idea and requested that the character be changed to his sister, which Foster found peculiar as Douglas is almost 20 years her senior and appeared with her in Napoleon and Samantha when Foster was only 9 years old while Douglas was 28.

Due to differences in opinions and scheduling conflicts with Robert Zemeckis' Contact, Foster could not appear in the film. Once she left, the role of Conrad was offered to Jeff Bridges, but he declined, and Sean Penn was eventually cast. Later, Foster alleged that she and PolyGram had orally agreed that she would appear in the film, and when this did not transpire, she filed a $54.5 million lawsuit against the company.

Deborah Kara Unger's audition for the role of Christine was a test reel consisting of a two-minute sex scene from David Cronenberg's Crash. Douglas initially thought it was a joke, but when he and Fincher met her in person, they were impressed by her acting.

Filming
Principal photography began on location in San Francisco despite studio pressure to shoot in Los Angeles, which was cheaper. Fincher also considered shooting the film in Chicago and Seattle, but the former had no mansions nearby, and the latter did not have an adequate financial district. The script had been written with San Francisco in mind, and he liked the financial district's "old money, Wall Street vibe." However, that area of the city was very busy and hard to move around in. The production shot on weekends to have more control. Fincher utilized old stone buildings, small streets, and the city's hills to represent the class system pictorially. To convey the old money world, he set many scenes in restaurants with hardwood paneling and red leather.

For the visual look of Nicholas' wealthy lifestyle, Fincher and the film's cinematographer Harris Savides wanted to create a "rich and supple" feel, drawing inspiration from films like The Godfather, which featured visually appealing locations with ominous undertones. Once Nicholas left his protected world, Fincher and Savides let fluorescents, neon signs, and other background lights become overexposed to let "things get a bit wilder out in the real world." For The Game, Fincher used a Technicolor printing process called ENR, which gave the night sequences a smoother look. The challenge for him was to determine how much deception the audience could handle and whether they would "go for 45 minutes of red herrings." To address this, he staged scenes as simply as possible and used a single camera because "with multiple cameras, you run the risk of boring people with coverage."

The scene where Nicholas' taxi drives into the San Francisco Bay was shot near the Embarcadero. Meanwhile, the close-up of Douglas trapped in the back seat was filmed on a soundstage at Sony Pictures Studios in a large water tank. The actor was in a small compartment that was designed to resemble the backseat of a taxi, with three cameras capturing the action.

Principal photography lasted 100 days, with much of the shooting done at night at various locations.

Release
The Game was released on September 12, 1997, in 2,403 theaters, and grossed $14.3 million during its opening weekend. It went on to make $48.3 million in North America and $61.1 million in the rest of the world, for a worldwide total of $109.4 million.

Criterion Collection released The Game on Laserdisc in 1997, with exclusive features including an alternate ending and audio commentary from the creators. On September 18, 2012, it was reissued on DVD and Blu-ray. Universal Studios also released the movie on HD DVD format on April 17, 2007.

Reception

Critical response
Rotten Tomatoes reports an approval rating of 77% based on 64 reviews, with an average rating of 7.40/10. The website's critics consensus reads: "The ending could use a little work but this is otherwise another sterling example of David Fincher's iron grip on atmosphere and storytelling." Metacritic gives the film a weighted average score of 61 out of 100 based on reviews from 19 critics, indicating "generally favorable reviews." Audiences polled by CinemaScore gave the film an average grade of "B−" on an A+ to F scale.

Roger Ebert of the Chicago Sun-Times gave the film three and a half stars out of four, praising Douglas as "the right actor for the role. He can play smart, he can play cold, and he can play angry. He is also subtle enough that he never arrives at an emotional plateau before the film does, and never overplays the process of his inner change." In her review for The New York Times, Janet Maslin wrote, "Mr. Fincher, like Michael Douglas in the film's leading role, does show real finesse in playing to the paranoia of these times."

Time magazine's Richard Corliss wrote, "Fincher's style is so handsomely oppressive, and Douglas' befuddlement is so cagey, that for a while, the film recalls smarter excursions into heroic paranoia (The Parallax View, Total Recall)." In his review for The Washington Post, Desson Howe wrote, "It's formulaic, yet edgy. It's predictable, yet full of surprises. How far you get through this tall tale of a thriller before you give up and howl is a matter of personal taste. But there's much pleasure in Fincher's intricate color schemes, his rich sense of decor, his ability to sustain suspense over long periods of time and his sense of humor." Entertainment Weekly gave the film a "B+" rating, and Owen Gleiberman wrote, "Emotionally, there's not much at stake in The Game—can Nicholas Van Orton be saved?!—but Douglas is the perfect actor to occupy the center of a crazed Rube Goldberg thriller. The movie has the wit to be playful about its own manipulations, even as it exploits them for maximum pulp impact."

In his review for the San Francisco Chronicle, Mick LaSalle wrote, "At times The Game is frustrating to watch, but that's just a measure of how well Fincher succeeds in putting us in his hero's shoes." However, Rolling Stone magazine's Peter Travers felt that "Fincher's effort to cover up the plot holes is all the more noticeable for being strained...The Game has a sunny, redemptive side that ill suits Fincher and ill serves audiences that share his former affinity for loose ends hauntingly left untied."

Retrospect
In retrospect, Michael Douglas said:

David Fincher later admitted in interviews that he was not proud of the movie. Explaining his working relationship with his wife, longtime producer Ceán Chaffin, the filmmaker said he discusses his projects with her and that they'll often disagree:

Literary assessment
In the film notes of the Criterion edition, the director was referred to as incorporating elements of the writings of Franz Kafka, stating:

Accolades
A sequence from the film deemed to be the most thrilling was ranked no. 44 on Bravo's The 100 Scariest Movie Moments.

See also
 Alternate reality game
 Birthday effect
 Simulacrum
 Twist ending

Citations

General references

External links

 
 
 
 
 All in The Game an essay by David Sterritt at the Criterion Collection

1997 films
1997 action thriller films
1990s mystery thriller films
1990s psychological thriller films
American action thriller films
American mystery thriller films
American psychological thriller films
1990s English-language films
Films about brothers
Films about games
Films directed by David Fincher
Films produced by Steve Golin
Films scored by Howard Shore
Films set in San Francisco
Films set in the San Francisco Bay Area
Films shot in San Francisco
PolyGram Filmed Entertainment films
American neo-noir films
1990s American films